Sharlyk (Şırlıq) is a rural locality (a village) and the administrative centre of Yanyshevsky Selsoviet, Blagovarsky District, Bashkortostan, Russia. The population was 506 as of 2010. There are 7 streets.

Geography 
Sharlyk is located 32 km north of Yazykovo (the district's administrative centre) by road. Neyfeld is the nearest rural locality.

References 

Rural localities in Blagovarsky District